Below are the list of the formerly aired programs of Net 25 (including UltraVision 25 and Planet 25); for current programs, see List of programs broadcast by Net 25.

Previous programs
Note: Titles are listed in alphabetical order, followed by the year of debut in parentheses.

Eagle News Service
1062 kHz Balita Update (2002–2007)
Agila Balita (2013–2020)
Agila Pilipinas (2019–2021)
Agila Probinsiya (2014–2021)
Agila Reports (2003–2007)
Aprub (2011–2019)
ASEAN in Focus (2014–2022)
Balitalakayan (2021–2022)
Captured (2003–2005)
Con Todos Recados (2001–2005)
Diskusyon (2014–2019)
DW-TV Journal (2003–2015)
DW News (2015, 2019–2022)
Eagle News Evening Edition (2011–2013)
Eagle News International (2013–2022)
Eagle News International Filipino Edition (2018–2021)
Eagle News Morning Edition (2011–2013)
Eagle News Update (2011–2022)
Eagle News Weekend Edition (2011–2012)
Exclusive (2012)
Focus AEC: ASEAN Economy Community (2013–2014)
Gabay sa Kalusugan (2006–2008)
Home Page (2008–2013)
In Case of Emergency (2016)
I-Balita (2007–2011)
I-Balita Online (2011–2013)
I-Balita Update (2010–2011)
I-Balita Weekend Report (2011)
I-News (2008–2011)
Kapatid sa Hanapbuhay (2006–2008)
Klima ng Pagbabago (2014–2019)
Masayang Umaga Po! (2015–2017)
Net 25 Report (2001–2008)
Newsbeat (2004–2007)
Openline (2003–2007)
Pambansang Almusal (2011–2021)
Patakaran kasama si Atty. Tranquil Salvador III (2014–2019)
Piskante ng Bayan (2013–2021)
Planet 25 Report (2000–2001)
Responde: Tugon Aksyon Ngayon (2011–2019)
UltraVision 25 Report (1999–2000)
World Report (2001–2008)
World Report Early Edition (2001–2003)
World Report Filipino Edition (2001–2004)

Lifestyle and entertainment
5 Girls and a Dad (2012)
Ang Daigdig Ko'y Ikaw (2020)
ArTalk: Beyond Entertainment (2012–2013)
Arts.21 (2003–2011)
Beautiful Sunday (2017–2018)
Bee Happy Go Lucky (2018)
Camera Geek TV (2011–2012)
Chinatown TV (2017–2019)
ChiNoy Star Ka Na! (2013–2014)
Chinoy TV (2010–2014)
Class7 Civil Servant (2014)
Cucina ni Nadia (2021-2022)
Destination Philippines (2012)
Discover Germany (2008–2011)
Donny & Marie (2002–2006)
Eat's Singing Time (2021)
Euromaxx (2003–2011)
Fil-Am Jams (2013–2014)
The Fitness Couple (2013)
Flower I Am (2014)
Footprints (2010–2012)
Funniest Snackable Videos (2021–2022)
Gabay at Aksyon (2017–2018, moved to IBC 13)
Galing Ng Pinoy (2018)
Global 3000 (2008-2022)
Happy Time (2020–2021)
Himig ng Lahi (2020-2022)
Home Grown (2002–2004)
House Calls (2002–2006)
I, Mee and U (2018–2019)
Ikaw ay Akin (2021)
In Good Shape (2008–2015)
The Janice Hung Show (2015)
Kesayasaya (2020–2021)
Let's Get Ready to TVRadyo (2021–2022)
MTRCB Uncut (2015–2016)
The New Yankee Workshop (2001–2003)
Noli Me Tangere (2002–2003)
On-Set: The World Class Filipino Artist (2009–2012)
Our House (2001–2004)
Panalo o Talo, It's You (2022)
The Planet (2004–2006)
Pelikwentuhan (2020–2021)
PEP News (2014–2019)
Pilot Guides (1999–2003)
Play Music Videos (2001–2005)
The Prodigal Prince (2018)
Red Carpet (2009–2012)
RYTS: Rule Yourself to Success (2018)
Sessions on 25th Street (2011–2018)
Sessions Presents (2012–2013)
Spoon (2007–2015)
Tagisan ng Galing (2019–2021)
Tara! Ating Pasyalana (2021-2022)
Tara Game, Agad Agad! (2021–2022)
Taumbahay (2012–2019)
Tol ng Bayan with Francis Tolentino (2018–2019)
The Snow Queen (2013; re-run: 2014)
Tribe (2006–2013, 2014–2019)
Urban Peasant (2003–2005)

Kid-oriented
Between the Lions (2002–2005)
The Country Mouse and the City Mouse Adventures (1999–2006)
Lil' Elvis and the Truckstoppers (2002–2006)
Lil' Horrors (2002–2004)
Math Magaling (2015)
Homework (2015–2019)
Oakie Doke (2001–2005)
Philbert Frog (2000–2006)
Popular Mechanics for Kids (1999–2003)
Wheel 2000 (2001–2004)
Zoboomafoo (2000–2002)

Religious (Iglesia ni Cristo)
Ang Mga Nagsialis sa Samahang Ang Dating Daan (2006–2007)
Dati'y Nasa Sumpa, Ngayon'y Nasa Tama (2004–2006)
Ilaw ng Kaligtasan (2004–2007)
Iglesia ni Cristo Chronicles (2004–2009)
Investigated: False (2012–2013)
Ito ang Payo (2003–2006)
Light of Salvation (2008–2012)
My Life (2012–2013)
Pananampalataya, Pag-asa at Pag-ibig (2010–2012)
Truth Uncovered (2012–2013)

Technology
Audio File (2000–2004)
Auto, Motor & Sport (2003–2006)
Beyond 2000 (2000–2004)
Call for Help (2000–2004)
Car Guys (1999–2003)
Computer Chronicles (2001–2003)
Convergence (2000–2016)
Cyberdoodoo (2003–2004)
Extended Play (2000–2003)
Fresh Gear (2001–2005)
NET Café (2001–2004)
Next Step (2002–2004)
Rev (2020-2022)
The Screen Savers (2001–2005)
Tomorrow Today (2003-2022)
www.com (2001–2004)
ZDTV News (2000–2003)
Zip File (2000–2004)

Sports
Bundesliga Kick Off! (2003-2018)
Filsports Basketball Association (2015–2016)
PBA Classics (1999–2000)
NAASCU Basketball (2011–2012)

Net 25 specials
Eagle Bayan Care-A-Van: The Net 25 Special Coverage (August 6, 2011)
Gintong Pangarap: Kapisanang Buklod 50th Anniversary Musicale (November 2012)
Kabayan Ko, Kapatid Ko: Net 25 and INCTV Special Coverage (2013–ongoing)
The Nation Decides 2010: Net 25 Election Coverage (May 10, 2010)
Pambansang Desisyon, Halalan 2013: Net 25 Election Coverage (May 13, 2013)
Desisyon ng Bayan 2016: Net 25 Election Coverage (May 9, 2016)
Desisyon ng Bayan 2019: Net 25 Election Coverage (May 13, 2019)
Mata ng Halalan 2022: Net 25  Election Coverage (May 9, 2022)
Lea Salonga... Your Songs (January 23 & 24, 2010)
Eduardo Manalo: Dalawang Taon ng Pamamahala (September 7–11, 2011)
INC Worldwide Walk For Those Affected by Typhoon Yolanda Special Coverage (February 15, 2014, together with INC TV)
Lingap sa Mamamayan: Barrio Maligaya Resettlement Site 49th Anniversary Special Coverage (February 22, 2014, together with INC TV)
INCinema Excellence in Visual Media Awards (November 17, 2013)
This is Kadiwa: GEMTV Special Coverage (December 23–25, 2010)
Mahal na Mahal Namin Kayo, Ka Erdy: The GEMNET/Net 25 Special Coverage (September 1–7, 2009) 
Martha Stewart's Secrets for Entertaining (November 13–16, 2001; re-runs, 2002–2006, 2007–2008)
PMPC Star Awards for Movies
PMPC Star Awards for Music
PMPC Star Awards for Television
One Plus One Equals Hapinas: Mas Masaya kung May Kasama concert special (July 7, 2013)
Pinas FM 955: Fun-Bansang Selebrasyon (June 16 and 17, 2012)
INC Worldwide Walk to Fight Poverty (May 5–7, 2018, in partnership with INCTV)
Panata Sa Bayan 2022: The KBP Presidential Candidate (February 4, 2022)

Newscasts (non-produced)
Chinese News TV (CNTV) (2017–2019, now moved to IBC from 2019–2020)

See also
Net 25
List of programs broadcast by Net 25

Net 25